American country pop singer Kelsea Ballerini has released four studio albums, one extended play, one compilation album, one remix album, and 14 singles, including two as a featured artist. Her first three singles all reached the top of the Billboard Country Airplay chart, making Ballerini the first female artist since Wynonna Judd in 1992 to accomplish this feat. The third such single, "Peter Pan", also made Ballerini the first female to top the Country Airplay and Hot Country Songs charts simultaneously since the latter was reformatted in 2012.

Albums

Studio albums

Compilation albums

Remix albums

Extended plays

Singles

As lead artist

As featured artist

Promotional singles

Other charted songs

Other appearances

Music videos

Songwriting credits

Notes

References

External links 

Country music discographies
Discographies of American artists